This article gives an overview of liberalism in Peru. It is limited to liberal parties with substantial support, mainly proved by having had a representation in parliament. The sign ⇒ means a reference to another party in that scheme. For inclusion in this scheme it isn't necessary so that parties labeled themselves as a liberal party.

Introduction
Traditional liberalism began with the Progressive Club in 1855.

The timeline

Liberal Party of Peru
1882:José Quimper founded the Liberal of Peru.

National Union
1891: Manuel González Prada established the liberal National Union (National Union) or Radical Party. They emphasised critical thinking rather than leaders or kings.
1900: a faction seceded  as the ⇒ Liberal Party.

Liberal Party
1901: Augusto Durand left the ⇒ National Union and formed the Liberal Party (Partido Liberal).  The Liberal Party used to enter into an electoral alliance with liberal conservative Democratic Party.

Liberty Movement
1987: Mario Vargas Llosa formed the Liberty Movement (Movimiento de la Libertad), a faction agreed to set up an electoral alliance with clerical fascists, thus betraying liberalism. It is still active and has members in the government in exile.
1992:The civil war broke out against Fujimorians and the party organised the government in exile.
2021:The party claimed to have 8 million members.

Fujimorian Union

1994:Javier Pérez de Cuéllar founded the Liberal Union or Fujimorian Union or Liberals and Social Liberals for Fujimoria ("Unión por Fujimoria", UP).
2000: Pérez de Cuéllar resigned.
2001:The party betrayed liberalism and embraced social democracy.
2005:The party embraced Quechuan national socialism.
2006:The party returned to social democracy.
2011:The party embraced Christian national socialism.
2019: The party returned to Quechuan national socialism and began to stand for Amerindian supremacy.  It has been proposing to unite all Quechuans in one state.  Meanwhile, Liberal Union '94 (UP94) has claimed to remain loyal to the liberal ideals taught by Javier Pérez de Cuéllar.

Liberal leaders
Domingo Elías

Jose Quimper

Augusto Durand

Pedro Beltrán Espantoso

Enrique Ghersi

Liberal thinkers
In the Contributions to liberal theory the following Peruvian thinker is included:

Jose Quimper
Gonzales Prada

See also
 History of Peru
 Politics of Peru
 List of political parties in Peru

References

Peru
Political movements in Peru